Muhammad Zamir bin Selamat (born 9 June 1989) is a Malaysian footballer who plays as a goalkeeper.

Zamir previously played for Harimau Muda, Johor Darul Ta'zim, PKNS and Perak.

Club career

PKNS
Zamir rejoined PKNS at the end of 2016 after his contract with Perak expired. On 4 February 2017, Zamir made his first appearance for the club in a 5–3 win over Selangor in Malaysia Super League match. He has made 11 league appearances for the club before been released at the end of the season.

Melaka United
On 15 November 2017, Zamir signed a one-year contract with Malaysia Super League club Melaka United. Zamir made his debut on 3 February 2018 in 2–1 win over Kelantan at Hang Jebat Stadium.

Kuala Lumpur
He signed for Kuala Lumpur for the 2020–2021 season.

UiTM (Loan)
On 25 July 2021, he made his first appearance for UiTM against Johor Darul Ta'zim. They lose 3–1. He made a good impression in that game.

International career
Zamir was called up by Malaysia 2009 coach K. Rajagobal for various upcoming tournaments such as the Ho Chi Minh City Cup, the 2010 Asian Games and the 2010 AFF Suzuki Cup.

Zamir was one of the players that participate in the Slovakian Tour for Harimau Muda A on 5 September 2010 until 9 November 2010.

Career statistics

Club

References

External links
 

1989 births
Living people
Malaysian footballers
Sportspeople from Kuala Lumpur
People from Kuala Lumpur
Perak F.C. players
PKNS F.C. players
Penang F.C. players
Melaka United F.C. players
Kuala Lumpur City F.C. players
Footballers at the 2010 Asian Games
Malaysian people of Malay descent
Association football goalkeepers
Asian Games competitors for Malaysia